Pawn is a 2013 American direct-to-video film directed by David A. Armstrong in his directorial debut.

Plot
An old gangster, with a hard drive containing records of who he paid off, is targeted by a competition between dirty cops, internal affairs, etc.   The dirty cops hire a thug to get into the safe (in the back of a diner) at midnight. But he brings his friends and goes too early for the time-release lock. Another crooked cop shows up (for uncertain reasons). The shooting ensues and during hostage negotiations the thug tries to put the blame onto an ex-con who just got out of jail, so that no one notices the real target is the hard drive.

Cast

Forest Whitaker as Sgt. Will Tompkins
Michael Chiklis as Derrick
Stephen Lang as Charlie
Ray Liotta as Man in the Suit
Nikki Reed as Amanda Davenport 
Common as Jeff Porter
Marton Csokas as Lt. Barnes
Max Beesley as Billy
Jonathan Bennett as Aaron
Cameron Denny as Nigel
Jessica Szohr as Bonnie Petrowski
Sean Faris as Nick Davenport
Ronald Guttman as Yuri Mikhailov
Jordan Belfi as Patrick Davenport

References

External links
 
 
 

2013 films
2013 crime drama films
American crime drama films
2013 directorial debut films
Films shot in Connecticut
2010s English-language films
2010s American films